The U.S. Arms Control and Disarmament Agency (ACDA) was an independent agency of the United States government that existed from 1961 to 1999.  Its mission was to strengthen United States national security by "formulating, advocating, negotiating, implementing and verifying effective arms control, nonproliferation, and disarmament policies, strategies, and agreements."

In so doing, ACDA ensured that arms control was fully integrated into the development and conduct of United States national security policy. ACDA also conducted, supported, and coordinated research for arms control and disarmament policy formulation, prepared for and managed U.S. participation in international arms control and disarmament negotiations, and prepared, operated, and directed U.S. participation in international arms control and disarmament systems.

1961 creation

The Arms Control and Disarmament Agency was established by the Arms Control and Disarmament Act, . The  bill was drafted by presidential adviser John J. McCloy. Its predecessor was the U.S. Disarmament Administration, part of the U.S. Department of State (1960–61).

Early mission

In the 1970s emphasis of the agency was placed upon gaining an understanding of the strategic weapons capabilities of the Soviet Union and People's Republic of China. The electronic reconnaissance capability of the United States was expanded through federal agency research and private contract research, utilizing radio frequency as well as optical technologies. The theory of this mission was that a clearer understanding of other nations' strategic capabilities was an important initial step in prevention of nuclear war.

1997 reorganization
In 1997, the Clinton administration announced the partial integration of ACDA with the State Department as part of the reinvention of the agencies which implement the nation’s foreign policy.

The ACDA Director served as both the Under Secretary of State for Arms Control and International Security Affairs and a Senior Adviser to the President and the Secretary of State for Arms Control, Nonproliferation, and Disarmament. He communicated with the President through the Secretary of State. In his capacity as senior advisor to the president, the Under Secretary attended and participated, at the direction of the president, in National Security Council (NSC) and subordinate meetings pertaining to arms control, nonproliferation, and disarmament and had the right to communicate, through the Secretary of State, with the President and members of the NSC on arms control, nonproliferation, and disarmament concerns.

1999 end
As of April 1, 1999, ACDA was abolished and its functions merged into the Department of State. The functions of the ACDA Director were replaced by the office of the Under Secretary of State for Arms Control and International Security Affairs and by the office of the Senior Advisor to the President and the Secretary of State for Arms Control, Nonproliferation, and Disarmament. ACDA's bureaus, along with the State Department's Bureau of Political-Military Affairs, were moved to the Under Secretary for Arms Control and International Security to form four bureaus: Political-Military Affairs, Bureau of Arms Control, Bureau of Nonproliferation, and the Bureau of Verification and Compliance. Additional reorganizations of the arms control function took place in subsequent years, and as of 2023, those functions are carried out by the Bureau of Political-Military Affairs, the Bureau of Arms Control, Verification and Compliance, and the Bureau of International Security and Nonproliferation.

List of directors

The directors of the Arms Control and Disarmament Agency were:

William Chapman Foster (1961–68)
Gerard C. Smith (1969–73)
Fred Iklé (1973–77)
Paul Warnke (1977–78)
George M. Seignious (1978–80)
Ralph Earle (1980–81)
Eugene V. Rostow (1981–83)
Kenneth Adelman (1983–87)
William F. Burns (1988–89)
Ronald F. Lehman (1989–93)
John D. Holum (1993–99)

References

External links
 
 
 
 ACDA Mission Statement 
 White House Statements about 1997 Reorganization 
 Fiscal Year 2000 Budget 
 
 Records of the U.S. Arms Control and Disarmament Agency – National Archives

Arms control
1961 establishments in the United States
1999 disestablishments in the United States
Defunct independent agencies of the United States government
Military disbanding and disarmament
United States Department of State